The (Second) Battle of Buzenval, also known as the Battle of Mont Valérien, was part of the siege of Paris during the Franco-Prussian War. On 19 January 1871, the day after Wilhelm I was proclaimed German Emperor, Louis Jules Trochu attacked the Germans west of Paris in Buzenval Park. The attackers seized the town of Saint-Cloud, coming close to the new Emperor's headquarters at Versailles. Trochu was able to maintain his position at St. Cloud for most of the day, but the failure of other French forces to hold their positions left him isolated and the Crown Prince's army was able to force Trochu's salient back into Paris by the next day. This was the last effort to break out of Paris. Trochu turned over command of the Paris defenses to Joseph Vinoy who surrendered the city ten days later.

Sources
Battles & Leaders

See also
 Battle of Buzenval (1870)

External links 
 

Battles of the Franco-Prussian War
Buzenval 1871
History of Hauts-de-Seine
1871 in France
January 1871 events